The 64th United States Congress was a meeting of the legislative branch of the United States federal government, composed of the United States Senate and the United States House of Representatives. It met in Washington, D.C., from March 4, 1915, to March 4, 1917, during the third and fourth years of Woodrow Wilson's presidency. The apportionment of seats in the House of Representatives was based on the 1910 United States census.

The Democrats maintained a majority in both chambers (albeit reduced in the House), and along with president Wilson also maintained an overall federal government trifecta.

Major events

June 9, 1915: (Prelude to World War I):U.S. Secretary of State William Jennings Bryan resigned over a disagreement regarding the nation's handling of the RMS Lusitania sinking.
July 24, 1915: The steamer SS Eastland capsized in central Chicago, with the loss of 844 lives.
July 28, 1915: The United States occupation of Haiti began.
August 5–August 23, 1915: Hurricane Two of the 1915 Atlantic hurricane season over Galveston and New Orleans left 275 dead.
March 8–March 9, 1916: Mexican Revolution: Pancho Villa led about 500 Mexican raiders in an attack against Columbus, New Mexico, killing 12 U.S. soldiers. A garrison of the U.S. 13th Cavalry Regiment fights back and drives them away.
March 15, 1916: President Woodrow Wilson sent 12,000 United States troops over the U.S.-Mexico border to pursue Pancho Villa.
May 5, 1916: United States Marines invaded the Dominican Republic.
July 30, 1916: German agents caused the Black Tom explosion in Jersey City, New Jersey, an act of sabotage destroying an ammunition depot and killing at least 7 people.
November 7, 1916: U.S. presidential election, 1916: Democratic President Woodrow Wilson narrowly defeated Republican Charles E. Hughes.
January 11, 1917: (Prelude to World War I): German saboteurs set off the Kingsland Explosion at Kingsland, NJ (now Lyndhurst, NJ), one of the events leading to U.S. involvement in World War I.
February 3, 1917: (Prelude to World War I):The United States severs diplomatic relations with Germany

Major legislation
 May 15, 1916: Kern Amendment
 May 29, 1916: Fraudulent Advertising Act of 1916
 May 31, 1916: Tillman Act
 June 3, 1916: National Defense Act of 1916
 June 9, 1916: Chamberlain–Ferris Act
 July 11, 1916: Federal Aid Road Act of 1916 (Bankhead–Shackleford Act, also known as Federal "Good Roads" Act)
 July 11, 1916: Terminal Inspection Act of 1916
 July 17, 1916: Federal Farm Loan Act (Hollis–Lever Act)
 July 27, 1916: River and Harbors Act of 1916
 July 28, 1916: Space Basis Act
 July 28, 1916: Railway Mail Service Pay Act
 August 9, 1916: Uniform Bill of Lading Act of 1916
 August 11, 1916: Irrigation District Act of 1916 (Smith Act)
 August 11, 1916: Wildlife Game Refuges Act of 1916
 August 11, 1916: Grain Standards Act of 1916
 August 11, 1916: Cotton Futures Act of 1916
 August 11, 1916: Brush Disposal Act of 1916
 August 11, 1916: Warehouse Act of 1916
 August 25, 1916: National Park Service Act (Kent–Smoot Act)
 August 29, 1916: 2nd Uniform Bill of Lading Act of 1916
 August 29, 1916: Jones Act (Philippines)
 August 29, 1916: Federal Possession and Control Act of 1916
 August 29, 1916: Army Appropriations Act of 1916
 August 29, 1916: Naval Act of 1916
 August 29, 1916: Naval Reserve Force Act
 August 31, 1916: Federal Standard Container Act
 August 31, 1916: Standard Fruits and Vegetable Baskets and Containers Act of 1916
 September 1, 1916: Keating–Owen Act
 September 3, 1916: Adamson Act
 September 7, 1916: Merchant Marine Act of 1916 (Alexander Act)
 September 7, 1916: Workingmen's Compensation Act (Kern–McGillicuddy Act)
 September 8, 1916: Anti-Dumping Act of 1916
 September 8, 1916: Emergency Revenue Act of 1916
 October 20, 1916: Special Air Preparedness Act
 December 29, 1916: Stock-Raising Homestead Act
 February 5, 1917: Immigration Act of 1917
 February 22, 1917: Federal Interpleader Act of 1917
 February 23, 1917: Smith–Hughes Act
 February 26, 1917: Mount McKinley National Park Act of 1917
 March 1, 1917: Flood Control Act of 1917 (Ransdell–Humphreys Act)
 March 2, 1917: Jones–Shafroth Act
 March 3, 1917: Reed Amendment
 March 3, 1917: Sheppard Bone-Dry Act
 March 3, 1917: Special Preparedness Fund Act of 1917
 March 4, 1917: Timber Export Act

Treaties 
January 17, 1917: Treaty of the Danish West Indies signed by President Wilson, ceding the Danish West Indies to the United States after their purchase from Denmark, and renaming them the US Virgin Islands.

Party summary

Senate

House of Representatives

Leadership

Senate
President: Thomas R. Marshall (D)
Presidents pro tempore: James P. Clarke (D) and Willard Saulsbury Jr. (D)
Majority Whip: J. Hamilton Lewis (D)
Minority Whip: Charles Curtis (R)
Republican Conference Chairman: Jacob Harold Gallinger
 Democratic Caucus Chairman: John W. Kern
 Republican Conference Secretary: James Wolcott Wadsworth Jr.
 Democratic Caucus Secretary: Willard Saulsbury Jr., until December 14, 1916
 Key Pittman, acting

House of Representatives
Speaker: Champ Clark (D)

Majority (Democratic) leadership
Majority Leader: Claude Kitchin
Majority Whip: vacant
 Democratic Caucus Chairman: Edward W. Saunders
 Democratic Campaign Committee Chairman: Frank Ellsworth Doremus

Minority (Republican) leadership
Minority Leader: James R. Mann
Minority Whip: Charles M. Hamilton
 Republican Conference Chairman: William S. Greene
 Republican Campaign Committee Chairman: Frank P. Woods

Members
Skip to House of Representatives, below

Senate

Prior to the 64th Congress, per Article 1, Section 3, Clause 1 of the Constitution, all Senators had been "chosen by the [State] Legislature thereof."  (As a practical matter many Senators had been "elected" however technically those elections were subject to affirmation by the State Legislatures.)

However, 32 Senators of the 64th Congress - those of Senate Class 3 - were directly elected by popular vote in the 1914 United States Senate Elections as directed by the 17th Amendment.  The 17th stipulated that it "...shall not be so construed as to affect the election or term of any Senator chosen before it becomes valid as part of the Constitution."  Thus Class 1 and 2 Senators were not subject to election until 1916 and 1918 respectively. (Note however that should a Senator have perished prior to the end of his term then their replacement would have been subject to direct election as they would not have been "chosen before" ratification.  This is why Augustus Bacon was the first Senator constitutionally elected on July 15, 1913.)

Alabama 
 2. John H. Bankhead (D)
 3. Oscar W. Underwood (D)

Arizona 
 1. Henry F. Ashurst (D)
 3. Marcus A. Smith (D)

Arkansas 
 2. Joseph T. Robinson (D)
 3. James P. Clarke (D), until October 1, 1916
 William F. Kirby (D), from November 8, 1916

California 
 1. John D. Works (R)
 3. James D. Phelan (D)

Colorado 
 2. John F. Shafroth (D)
 3. Charles S. Thomas (D)

Connecticut 
 1. George P. McLean (R)
 3. Frank B. Brandegee (R)

Delaware 
 1. Henry A. du Pont (R)
 2. Willard Saulsbury Jr. (D)

Florida 
 1. Nathan P. Bryan (D)
 3. Duncan U. Fletcher (D)

Georgia 
 2. Thomas W. Hardwick (D)
 3. Hoke Smith (D)

Idaho 
 2. William E. Borah (R)
 3. James H. Brady (R)

Illinois 
 2. James H. Lewis (D)
 3. Lawrence Y. Sherman (R)

Indiana 
 1. John W. Kern (D)
 3. Benjamin F. Shively (D), until March 14, 1916
 Thomas Taggart (D), March 20, 1916 - November 7, 1916
 James E. Watson (R), from November 8, 1916

Iowa 
 2. William S. Kenyon (R)
 3. Albert B. Cummins (R)

Kansas 
 2. William H. Thompson (D)
 3. Charles Curtis (R)

Kentucky 
 2. Ollie M. James (D)
 3. John C.W. Beckham (D)

Louisiana 
 2. Joseph E. Ransdell (D)
 3. Robert F. Broussard (D)

Maine 
 1. Charles Fletcher Johnson (D)
 2. Edwin C. Burleigh (R), until June 16, 1916
 Bert M. Fernald (R), from September 11, 1916

Maryland 
 1. Blair Lee (D)
 3. John Walter Smith (D)

Massachusetts 
 1. Henry Cabot Lodge (R)
 2. John W. Weeks (R)

Michigan 
 1. Charles E. Townsend (R)
 2. William Alden Smith (R)

Minnesota 
 1. Moses E. Clapp (R)
 2. Knute Nelson (R)

Mississippi 
 1. John Sharp Williams (D)
 2. James K. Vardaman (D)

Missouri 
 1. James A. Reed (D)
 3. William J. Stone (D)

Montana 
 1. Henry L. Myers (D)
 2. Thomas J. Walsh (D)

Nebraska 
 1. Gilbert M. Hitchcock (D)
 2. George W. Norris (R)

Nevada 
 1. Key Pittman (D)
 3. Francis G. Newlands (D)

New Hampshire 
 2. Henry F. Hollis (D)
 3. Jacob H. Gallinger (R)

New Jersey 
 1. James E. Martine (D)
 2. William Hughes (D)

New Mexico 
 1. Thomas B. Catron (R)
 2. Albert B. Fall (R)

New York 
 1. James A. O'Gorman (D)
 3. James Wolcott Wadsworth Jr. (R)

North Carolina 
 2. Furnifold M. Simmons (D)
 3. Lee S. Overman (D)

North Dakota 
 1. Porter J. McCumber (R)
 3. Asle J. Gronna (R)

Ohio 
 1. Atlee Pomerene (D)
 3. Warren G. Harding (R)

Oklahoma 
 2. Robert L. Owen (D)
 3. Thomas P. Gore (D)

Oregon 
 2. Harry Lane (D)
 3. George E. Chamberlain (D)

Pennsylvania 
 1. George T. Oliver (R)
 3. Boies Penrose (R)

Rhode Island 
 1. Henry F. Lippitt (R)
 2. LeBaron B. Colt (R)

South Carolina 
 2. Benjamin R. Tillman (D)
 3. Ellison D. Smith (D)

South Dakota 
 2. Thomas Sterling (R)
 3. Edwin S. Johnson (D)

Tennessee 
 1. Luke Lea (D)
 2. John K. Shields (D)

Texas 
 1. Charles A. Culberson (D)
 2. Morris Sheppard (D)

Utah 
 1. George Sutherland (R)
 3. Reed Smoot (R)

Vermont 
 1. Carroll S. Page (R)
 3. William P. Dillingham (R)

Virginia 
 1. Claude A. Swanson (D)
 2. Thomas S. Martin (D)

Washington 
 1. Miles Poindexter (R)
 3. Wesley L. Jones (R)

West Virginia 
 1. William E. Chilton (D)
 2. Nathan Goff (R)

Wisconsin 
 1. Robert M. La Follette Sr. (R)
 3. Paul O. Husting (D)

Wyoming 
 1. Clarence D. Clark (R)
 2. Francis E. Warren (R)

House of Representatives

The names of members of the House of Representatives are preceded by their district numbers.

Alabama 
 . John Abercrombie (D)
 . Oscar Lee Gray (D)
 . S. Hubert Dent Jr. (D)
 . Henry B. Steagall (D)
 . Fred L. Blackmon (D)
 . J. Thomas Heflin (D)
 . William B. Oliver (D)
 . John L. Burnett (D)
 . Edward B. Almon (D)
 . George Huddleston (D)

Arizona 
 . Carl Hayden (D)

Arkansas 
 . Thaddeus H. Caraway (D)
 . William A. Oldfield (D)
 . John N. Tillman (D)
 . Otis Wingo (D)
 . Henderson M. Jacoway (D)
 . Samuel M. Taylor (D)
 . William S. Goodwin (D)

California 
 . William Kent (I)
 . John E. Raker (D)
 . Charles F. Curry (R)
 . Julius Kahn (R)
 . John I. Nolan (R)
 . John A. Elston (Prog.)
 . Denver S. Church (D)
 . Everis A. Hayes (R)
 . Charles H. Randall (Proh.)
 . William Stephens (Prog.), until July 22, 1916
 Henry S. Benedict (R), from November 7, 1916
 . William Kettner (D)

Colorado 
 . Benjamin Clark Hilliard (D)
 . Charles Bateman Timberlake (R)
 . Edward Keating (D)
 . Edward Thomas Taylor (D)

Connecticut 
 . P. Davis Oakey (R)
 . Richard P. Freeman (R)
 . John Q. Tilson (R)
 . Ebenezer J. Hill (R)
 . James P. Glynn (R)

Delaware 
 . Thomas W. Miller (R)

Florida 
 . Stephen M. Sparkman (D)
 . Frank Clark (D)
 . Emmett Wilson (D)
 . William J. Sears (D)

Georgia 
 . Charles G. Edwards (D)
 . Frank Park (D)
 . Charles R. Crisp (D)
 . William C. Adamson (D)
 . William S. Howard (D)
 . James W. Wise (D)
 . Gordon Lee (D)
 . Samuel Joelah Tribble (D), until December 8, 1916
 Tinsley W. Rucker Jr. (D), from January 11, 1917
 . Thomas Montgomery Bell (D)
 . Carl Vinson (D)
 . John R. Walker (D)
 . Dudley M. Hughes (D)

Idaho 
 . Addison T. Smith (R)
 . Robert M. McCracken (R)

Illinois 
 . Burnett M. Chiperfield (R)
 . William E. Williams (D)
 . Martin B. Madden (R)
 . James R. Mann (R)
 . William W. Wilson (R)
 . James T. McDermott (D)
 . Adolph J. Sabath (D)
 . James McAndrews (D)
 . Frank Buchanan (D)
 . Thomas Gallagher (D)
 . Frederick A. Britten (R)
 . George E. Foss (R)
 . Ira C. Copley (Prog.)
 . Charles Eugene Fuller (R)
 . John C. McKenzie (R)
 . Clyde H. Tavenner (D)
 . Edward John King (R)
 . Claude U. Stone (D)
 . John A. Sterling (R)
 . Joseph G. Cannon (R)
 . William B. McKinley (R)
 . Henry T. Rainey (D)
 . Loren E. Wheeler (R)
 . William A. Rodenberg (R)
 . Martin D. Foster (D)
 . Thomas S. Williams (R)
 . Edward E. Denison (R)

Indiana 
 . Charles Lieb (D)
 . William A. Cullop (D)
 . William E. Cox (D)
 . Lincoln Dixon (D)
 . Ralph Wilbur Moss (D)
 . Finly H. Gray (D)
 . Merrill Moores (R)
 . John A.M. Adair (D)
 . Martin A. Morrison (D)
 . William Robert Wood (R)
 . George W. Rauch (D)
 . Cyrus Cline (D)
 . Henry A. Barnhart (D)

Iowa 
 . Charles A. Kennedy (R)
 . Harry E. Hull (R)
 . Burton E. Sweet (R)
 . Gilbert N. Haugen (R)
 . James W. Good (R)
 . C. William Ramseyer (R)
 . Cassius C. Dowell (R)
 . Horace M. Towner (R)
 . William R. Green (R)
 . Frank P. Woods (R)
 . Thomas J. Steele (D)

Kansas 
 . Daniel Read Anthony Jr. (R)
 . Joseph Taggart (D)
 . Philip P. Campbell (R)
 . Dudley Doolittle (D)
 . Guy T. Helvering (D)
 . John R. Connelly (D)
 . Jouett Shouse (D)
 . William A. Ayres (D)

Kentucky 
 . Alben Barkley (D)
 . David Hayes Kincheloe (D)
 . Robert Y. Thomas Jr. (D)
 . Ben Johnson (D)
 . J. Swagar Sherley (D)
 . Arthur B. Rouse (D)
 . J. Campbell Cantrill (D)
 . Harvey Helm (D)
 . William Jason Fields (D)
 . John W. Langley (R)
 . Caleb Powers (R)

Louisiana 
 . Albert Estopinal (D)
 . Henry Garland Dupré (D)
 . Whitmell P. Martin (Prog.)
 . John Thomas Watkins (D)
 . Riley Joseph Wilson (D)
 . Lewis Lovering Morgan (D)
 . Ladislas Lazaro (D)
 . James Benjamin Aswell (D)

Maine 
 . Asher C. Hinds (R)
 . Daniel J. McGillicuddy (D)
 . John A. Peters (R)
 . Frank E. Guernsey (R)

Maryland 
 . Jesse D. Price (D)
 . J. Frederick C. Talbott (D)
 . Charles P. Coady (D)
 . J. Charles Linthicum (D)
 . Sydney Emanuel Mudd II (R)
 . David J. Lewis (D)

Massachusetts 
 . Allen T. Treadway (R)
 . Frederick H. Gillett (R)
 . Calvin D. Paige (R)
 . Samuel E. Winslow (R)
 . John J. Rogers (R)
 . Augustus P. Gardner (R)
 . Michael F. Phelan (D)
 . Frederick W. Dallinger (R)
 . Ernest W. Roberts (R)
 . Peter F. Tague (D)
 . George H. Tinkham (R)
 . James A. Gallivan (D)
 . William H. Carter (R)
 . Richard Olney II (D)
 . William S. Greene (R)
 . Joseph Walsh (R)

Michigan 
 . Frank E. Doremus (D)
 . Samuel Beakes (D)
 . John M. C. Smith (R)
 . Edward L. Hamilton (R)
 . Carl Mapes (R)
 . Patrick H. Kelley (R)
 . Louis C. Cramton (R)
 . Joseph W. Fordney (R)
 . James C. McLaughlin (R)
 . George A. Loud (R)
 . Frank D. Scott (R)
 . W. Frank James (R)
 . Charles Archibald Nichols (R)

Minnesota 
 . Sydney Anderson (R)
 . Franklin Ellsworth (R)
 . Charles Russell Davis (R)
 . Carl Van Dyke (D)
 . George Ross Smith (R)
 . Charles August Lindbergh (R)
 . Andrew Volstead (R)
 . Clarence B. Miller (R)
 . Halvor Steenerson (R)
 . Thomas D. Schall (Prog.)

Mississippi 
 . Ezekiel S. Candler Jr. (D)
 . Hubert D. Stephens (D)
 . Benjamin G. Humphreys II (D)
 . Thomas U. Sisson (D)
 . Samuel Andrew Witherspoon (D), until November 24, 1915
 William Webb Venable (D), from January 4, 1916
 . Pat Harrison (D)
 . Percy E. Quin (D)
 . James W. Collier (D)

Missouri 
 . James Tilghman Lloyd (D)
 . William W. Rucker (D)
 . Joshua Willis Alexander (D)
 . Charles F. Booher (D)
 . William Patterson Borland (D)
 . Clement C. Dickinson (D)
 . Courtney W. Hamlin (D)
 . Dorsey W. Shackleford (D)
 . James Beauchamp Clark (D)
 . Jacob Edwin Meeker (R)
 . William Leo Igoe (D)
 . Leonidas C. Dyer (R)
 . Walter Lewis Hensley (D)
 . Joseph J. Russell (D)
 . Perl D. Decker (D)
 . Thomas L. Rubey (D)

Montana 
 . John M. Evans (D)
 . Tom Stout (D)

Nebraska 
 . C. Frank Reavis (R)
 . Charles O. Lobeck (D)
 . Dan V. Stephens (D)
 . Charles Henry Sloan (R)
 . Ashton C. Shallenberger (D)
 . Moses P. Kinkaid (R)

Nevada 
 . Edwin E. Roberts (R)

New Hampshire 
 . Cyrus Adams Sulloway (R)
 . Edward Hills Wason (R)

New Jersey 
 . William J. Browning (R)
 . Isaac Bacharach (R)
 . Thomas J. Scully (D)
 . Elijah C. Hutchinson (R)
 . John H. Capstick (R)
 . Archibald C. Hart (D)
 . Dow H. Drukker (R)
 . Edward W. Gray (R)
 . Richard W. Parker (R)
 . Frederick R. Lehlbach (R)
 . John J. Eagan (D)
 . James A. Hamill (D)

New Mexico 
 . Benigno C. Hernández (R)

New York 
 . Frederick C. Hicks (R) from January 4, 1916
 . C. Pope Caldwell (D)
 . Joseph V. Flynn (D)
 . Harry H. Dale (D)
 . James P. Maher (D)
 . Frederick W. Rowe (R)
 . John J. Fitzgerald (D)
 . Daniel J. Griffin (D)
 . Oscar W. Swift (R)
 . Reuben L. Haskell (R)
 . Daniel J. Riordan (D)
 . Meyer London (Soc.)
 . George W. Loft (D)
 . Michael F. Farley (D)
 . Michael F. Conry (D), until March 2, 1917
 . Peter J. Dooling (D)
 . John F. Carew (D)
 . Thomas G. Patten (D)
 . Walter M. Chandler (Prog.)
 . Isaac Siegel (R)
 . G. Murray Hulbert (D)
 . Henry Bruckner (D)
 . Joseph A. Goulden (D), until May 3, 1915
 William S. Bennet (R), from November 2, 1915
 . Woodson R. Oglesby (D)
 . James W. Husted (R)
 . Edmund Platt (R)
 . Charles B. Ward (R)
 . Rollin B. Sanford (R)
 . James S. Parker (R)
 . William B. Charles (R)
 . Bertrand H. Snell (R), from November 2, 1915
 . Luther W. Mott (R)
 . Homer P. Snyder (R)
 . George W. Fairchild (R)
 . Walter W. Magee (R)
 . Norman J. Gould (R), from November 2, 1915
 . Harry H. Pratt (R)
 . Thomas B. Dunn (R)
 . Henry G. Danforth (R)
 . S. Wallace Dempsey (R)
 . Charles B. Smith (D)
 . Daniel A. Driscoll (D)
 . Charles M. Hamilton (R)

North Carolina 
 . John Humphrey Small (D)
 . Claude Kitchin (D)
 . George E. Hood (D)
 . Edward W. Pou (D)
 . Charles M. Stedman (D)
 . Hannibal L. Godwin (D)
 . Robert N. Page (D)
 . Robert L. Doughton (D)
 . Edwin Y. Webb (D)
 . James Jefferson Britt (R)

North Dakota 
 . Henry Thomas Helgesen (R)
 . George M. Young (R)
 . Patrick Daniel Norton (R)

Ohio 
 . Nicholas Longworth (R)
 . Alfred G. Allen (D)
 . Warren Gard (D)
 . J. Edward Russell (R)
 . Nelson E. Matthews (R)
 . Charles C. Kearns (R)
 . Simeon D. Fess (R)
 . John A. Key (D)
 . Isaac R. Sherwood (D)
 . Robert M. Switzer (R)
 . Edwin D. Ricketts (R)
 . Clement L. Brumbaugh (D)
 . Arthur W. Overmyer (D)
 . Seward H. Williams (R)
 . William C. Mooney (R)
 . Roscoe C. McCulloch (R)
 . William A. Ashbrook (D)
 . David Hollingsworth (R)
 . John G. Cooper (R)
 . William Gordon (D)
 . Robert Crosser (D)
 . Henry I. Emerson (R)

Oklahoma 
 . James S. Davenport (D)
 . William W. Hastings (D)
 . Charles D. Carter (D)
 . William H. Murray (D)
 . Joseph Bryan Thompson (D)
 . Scott Ferris (D)
 . James V. McClintic (D)
 . Dick Thompson Morgan (R)

Oregon 
 . Willis C. Hawley (R)
 . Nicholas J. Sinnott (R)
 . Clifton N. McArthur (R)

Pennsylvania 
 . Thomas S. Crago (R)
 . John R.K. Scott (R)
 . Daniel F. Lafean (R)
 . Mahlon M. Garland (R)
 . William S. Vare (R)
 . George S. Graham (R)
 . J. Hampton Moore (R)
 . George W. Edmonds (R)
 . Peter E. Costello (R)
 . George P. Darrow (R)
 . Thomas S. Butler (R)
 . Henry Winfield Watson (R)
 . William W. Griest (R)
 . John R. Farr (R)
 . John J. Casey (D)
 . Robert D. Heaton (R)
 . Arthur G. Dewalt (D)
 . Louis T. McFadden (R)
 . Edgar R. Kiess (R)
 . John V. Lesher (D)
 . Benjamin K. Focht (R)
 . Aaron S. Kreider (R)
 . Warren W. Bailey (D)
 . C. William Beales (R)
 . Charles H. Rowland (R)
 . Abraham L. Keister (R)
 . Robert F. Hopwood (R)
 . Henry W. Temple (R), from November 2, 1915
 . Michael Liebel Jr. (D)
 . Henry J. Steele (D)
 . Solomon T. North (R)
 . Samuel H. Miller (R)
 . Stephen G. Porter (R)
 . William Henry Coleman (R)
 . John M. Morin (R)
 . Andrew J. Barchfeld (R)

Rhode Island 
 . George Francis O'Shaunessy (D)
 . Walter Russell Stiness (R)
 . Ambrose Kennedy (R)

South Carolina 
 . Richard S. Whaley (D)
 . James F. Byrnes (D)
 . Wyatt Aiken (D)
 . Joseph T. Johnson (D), until April 19, 1915
 Samuel J. Nicholls (D), from September 14, 1915
 . David E. Finley (D), until January 26, 1917
 Paul G. McCorkle (D), from February 21, 1917
 . J. Willard Ragsdale (D)
 . Asbury F. Lever (D)

South Dakota 
 . Charles H. Dillon (R)
 . Royal C. Johnson (R)
 . Harry L. Gandy (D)

Tennessee 
 . Sam R. Sells (R)
 . Richard W. Austin (R)
 . John Austin Moon (D)
 . Cordell Hull (D)
 . William C. Houston (D)
 . Joseph W. Byrns (D)
 . Lemuel Phillips Padgett (D)
 . Thetus Willrette Sims (D)
 . Finis J. Garrett (D)
 . Kenneth McKellar (D)

Texas 
 . James H. Davis (D)
 . A. Jeff McLemore (D)
 . Eugene Black (D)
 . Martin Dies (D)
 . James Young (D)
 . Sam Rayburn (D)
 . Hatton W. Sumners (D)
 . Rufus Hardy (D)
 . Alexander W. Gregg (D)
 . Joe H. Eagle (D)
 . George Farmer Burgess (D)
 . James P. Buchanan (D)
 . Robert L. Henry (D)
 . Oscar Callaway (D)
 . John Hall Stephens (D)
 . James L. Slayden (D)
 . John Nance Garner (D)
 . William R. Smith (D)

Utah 
 . Joseph Howell (R)
 . James Henry Mays (D)

Vermont 
 . Frank L. Greene (R)
 . Porter H. Dale (R)

Virginia 
 . William Atkinson Jones (D)
 . Edward Everett Holland (D)
 . Andrew Jackson Montague (D)
 . Walter Allen Watson (D)
 . Edward W. Saunders (D)
 . Carter Glass (D)
 . James Hay (D), until October 1, 1916
 Thomas W. Harrison (D), from November 7, 1916
 . Charles Creighton Carlin (D)
 . C. Bascom Slemp (R)
 . Henry De Flood (D)

Washington 
 . William E. Humphrey (R)
 . Lindley H. Hadley (R)
 . Albert Johnson (R)
 . William Leroy La Follette (R)
 . Clarence Cleveland Dill (D)

West Virginia 
 . Howard Sutherland (R)
 . Matthew M. Neely (D)
 . William Gay Brown Jr. (D), until March 9, 1916
 George M. Bowers (R), from May 9, 1916
 . Adam B. Littlepage (D)
 . Hunter H. Moss Jr. (R), until July 15, 1916
 Harry C. Woodyard (R), from November 7, 1916
 . Edward Cooper (R)

Wisconsin 
 . Henry Allen Cooper (R)
 . Michael Edmund Burke (D)
 . John M. Nelson (R)
 . William J. Cary (R)
 . William H. Stafford (R)
 . Michael K. Reilly (D)
 . John Jacob Esch (R)
 . Edward E. Browne (R)
 . Thomas Frank Konop (D)
 . James A. Frear (R)
 . Irvine L. Lenroot (R)

Wyoming 
 . Franklin Wheeler Mondell (R)

Non-voting members 
 . James Wickersham, (R)
 . Jonah Kuhio Kalanianaole, (R)
 . Manuel Earnshaw (Resident Commissioner), (I)
 . Manuel L. Quezon (Resident Commissioner), (Nac.) until October 15, 1916
 . Luis Muñoz Rivera (Resident Commissioner), (Unionist), until November 15, 1916

Changes in membership
The count below reflects changes from the beginning of the first session of this Congress.

Senate
 Replacements: 3
 Democratic: 1 seat net loss
 Republican: 1 seat net gain
 Deaths: 3
 Resignations: 0
 Vacancy: 0
 Total seats with changes:  4

House of Representatives
 Replacements: 9
 Democratic: 2 seat loss
 Republican: 3 seat gain
 Progressive: 1 seat loss
 Deaths: 8
 Resignations: 12
 Contested elections: 4
 Total seats with changes: 15

Committees

Senate

 Additional Accommodations for the Library of Congress (Select) (Chairman: Boies Penrose; Ranking Member: William J. Stone)
 Agriculture and Forestry (Chairman: Thomas P. Gore; Ranking Member: Francis E. Warren)
 Appropriations (Chairman: Thomas S. Martin; Ranking Member: Francis E. Warren)
 Audit and Control the Contingent Expenses of the Senate (Chairman: John S. Williams; Ranking Member: William P. Dillingham)
 Banking and Currency (Chairman: Robert L. Owen; Ranking Member: Knute Nelson)
 Canadian Relations (Chairman: John K. Shields; Ranking Member: George T. Oliver)
 Census (Chairman: William E. Chilton; Ranking Member: Robert M. La Follette)
 Civil Service and Retrenchment (Chairman: Atlee Pomerene; Ranking Member: Albert B. Cummins)
 Claims (Chairman: Nathan P. Bryan; Ranking Member: Edwin C. Burleigh then Nathan Goff)
 Coast and Insular Survey (Chairman: Willard Saulsbury; Ranking Member: Charles E. Townsend)
 Coast Defenses (Chairman: James E. Martine; Ranking Member: Henry A. du Pont)
 Commerce (Chairman: James P. Clarke; Ranking Member: Knute Nelson)
 Conservation of National Resources (Chairman: James K. Vardaman; Ranking Member: Clarence D. Clark)
 Corporations Organized in the District of Columbia (Chairman: Robert M. La Follette; Ranking Member: William J. Stone)
 Cuban Relations (Chairman: Joseph L. Bristow then Oscar Underwood; Ranking Member: William A. Smith)
 Disposition of Useless Papers in the Executive Departments (Chairman: Carroll S. Page; Ranking Member: James E. Martine)
 District of Columbia (Chairman: John W. Smith; Ranking Member: William P. Dillingham)
 Education and Labor (Chairman: Hoke Smith; Ranking Member: William E. Borah)
 Engrossed Bills (Chairman: Francis E. Warren; Ranking Member: Furnifold M. Simmons)
 Enrolled Bills (Chairman: Henry F. Hollis; Ranking Member: Charles Curtis)
 Establish a University in the United States (Select) (Chairman: N/A)
 Examine the Several Branches in the Civil Service (Chairman: William A. Smith; Ranking Member: Luke Lea)
 Expenditures in the Department of Agriculture (Chairman: Morris Sheppard; Ranking Member: Henry F. Lippitt)
 Expenditures in the Department of Commerce and Labor (Chairman: William H. Thompson; Ranking Member: Albert B. Fall)
 Expenditures in the Interior Department (Chairman: Reed Smoot; Ranking Member: Claude A. Swanson)
 Expenditures in the Department of Justice (Chairman: George Sutherland; Ranking Member: Key Pittman)
 Expenditures in the Navy Department (Chairman: William Hughes)
 Expenditures in the Post Office Department (Chairman: Blair Lee; Ranking Member: Asle Gronna)
 Expenditures in the Department of State (Chairman: J. Hamilton Lewis; Ranking Member: Boies Penrose)
 Expenditures in the Treasury Department (Chairman: Joseph T. Robinson; Ranking Member: John D. Works)
 Expenditures in the War Department (Chairman: Miles Poindexter; Ranking Member: Harry Lane)
 Finance (Chairman: Furnifold M. Simmons; Ranking Member: Boies Penrose)
 Fisheries (Chairman: John R. Thornton; Ranking Member: John D. Works)
 Five Civilized Tribes of Indians (Chairman: Knute Nelson; Ranking Member: Benjamin R. Tillman)
 Foreign Relations (Chairman: Augustus O. Bacon; Ranking Member: Henry Cabot Lodge) 
 Forest Reservations and the Protection of Game (Chairman: Harry Lane; Ranking Member: George P. McLean)
 Geological Survey (Chairman: Clarence D. Clark; Ranking Member: John W. Kern)
 Immigration (Chairman: Ellison D. Smith; Ranking Member: Henry Cabot Lodge)
 Indian Affairs (Chairman: William J. Stone; Ranking Member: Moses E. Clapp)
 Indian Depredations (Chairman: William E. Borah; Ranking Member: Claude A. Swanson)
 Industrial Expositions (Chairman: Henry F. Ashurst; Ranking Member: George T. Oliver)
 Interoceanic Canals (Chairman: James A. O'Gorman; Ranking Member: Frank B. Brandegee)
 Interstate Commerce (Chairman: Francis G. Newlands; Ranking Member: Moses E. Clapp)
 Irrigation and Reclamation of Arid Lands (Chairman: Marcus A. Smith; Ranking Member: Wesley L. Jones)
 Judiciary (Chairman: Charles A. Culberson; Ranking Member: Clarence D. Clark) 
 Library (Chairman: Luke Lea; Ranking Member: Albert B. Cummins)
 Manufactures (Chairman: James A. Reed; Ranking Member: George T. Oliver) 
 Military Affairs (Chairman: George E. Chamberlain; Ranking Member: Henry A. du Pont)
 Mines and Mining (Chairman: Thomas J. Walsh; Ranking Member: Miles Poindexter)
 Mississippi River and its Tributaries (Select) (Chairman: Albert B. Cummins; Ranking Member: John Sharp Williams)
 National Banks (Chairman: Charles F. Johnson; Ranking Member: James H. Brady)
 Naval Affairs (Chairman: Benjamin R. Tillman; Ranking Member: Boies Penrose)
 Pacific Islands and Puerto Rico (Chairman: John F. Shafroth; Ranking Member: Miles Poindexter)
 Pacific Railroads (Chairman: Frank B. Brandegee; Ranking Member: James A. Reed)
 Patents (Chairman: Ollie M. James; Ranking Member: Frank B. Brandegee)
 Pensions (Chairman: Benjamin F. Shively; Ranking Member: Porter J. McCumber)
 Philippines (Chairman: Gilbert M. Hitchcock; Ranking Member: George P. McLean)
 Post Office and Post Roads (Chairman: John H. Bankhead; Ranking Member: Boies Penrose)
 Printing (Chairman: Duncan U. Fletcher; Ranking Member: Reed Smoot)
 Private Land Claims (Chairman: Henry Cabot Lodge; Ranking Member: Benjamin R. Tillman)
 Privileges and Elections (Chairman: John W. Kern; Ranking Member: William P. Dillingham)
 Public Buildings and Grounds (Chairman: Claude A. Swanson; Ranking Member: George Sutherland)
 Public Health and National Quarantine (Chairman: Joseph E. Ransdell; Ranking Member: Reed Smoot)
 Public Lands (Chairman: Henry L. Myers; Ranking Member: Reed Smoot)
 Railroads (Chairman: George C. Perkins; Ranking Member: George T. Oliver)
 Revision of the Laws (Chairman: Joseph T. Robinson; Ranking Member: N/A)
 Revolutionary Claims (Chairman: William O. Bradley; Ranking Member: Edwin C. Burleigh then Charles Curtis)
 Rules (Chairman: Lee S. Overman; Ranking Member: Jacob H. Gallinger)
 Standards, Weights and Measures (Chairman: Moses E. Clapp; Ranking Member: John H. Bankhead)
 Tariff Regulation (Select)
 Telepost (Select)
 Territories (Chairman: Key Pittman; Ranking Member: Knute Nelson)
 Transportation and Sale of Meat Products (Select) (Chairman: Henry A. du Pont; Ranking Member: Henry F. Hollis)
 Transportation Routes to the Seaboard (Chairman: Porter J. McCumber; Ranking Member: Morris Sheppard)
 Trespassers upon Indian Lands (Select) (Chairman: Isaac Stephenson; Ranking Member: Miles Poindexter)
 Whole
 Woman Suffrage (Chairman: Charles S. Thomas; Ranking Member: George Sutherland)

House of Representatives

 Accounts (Chairman: James T. Lloyd; Ranking Member: Thomas W. Miller)
 Agriculture (Chairman: Asbury F. Lever; Ranking Member: Gilbert N. Haugen)
 Alcoholic Liquor Traffic (Chairman: Adolph J. Sabath; Ranking Member: Addison T. Smith)
 Appropriations (Chairman: John J. Fitzgerald; Ranking Member: Frederick H. Gillett)
 Banking and Currency (Chairman: Carter Glass; Ranking Member: Everis A. Hayes)
 Census (Chairman: Harvey Helm; Ranking Member: Asher C. Hinds)
 Claims (Chairman: Edward W. Pou; Ranking Member: George W. Edmonds)
 Coinage, Weights and Measures (Chairman: Thomas W. Hardwick; Ranking Member: Edwin E. Roberts)
 Disposition of Executive Papers (Chairman: J. Frederick Cockey Talbott; Ranking Member: William S. Bennet)
 District of Columbia (Chairman: Ben Johnson; Ranking Member: William J. Cary)
 Education (Chairman: Dudley M. Hughes; Ranking Member: Caleb Powers)
 Election of the President, Vice President and Representatives in Congress (Chairman: William W. Rucker; Ranking Member: Carl E. Mapes)
 Elections No.#1 (Chairman: James D. Post; Ranking Member: Merrill Moores)
 Elections No.#2 (Chairman: James A. Hamill; Ranking Member: John Jacob Rogers)
 Elections No.#3 (Chairman: Lewis L. Morgan; Ranking Member: Cassius C. Dowell)
 Enrolled Bills (Chairman: William A. Ashbrook; Ranking Member: William R. Wood)
 Expenditures in the Agriculture Department (Chairman: Robert L. Doughton; Ranking Member: Edward J. King)
 Expenditures in the Commerce Department (Chairman: John H. Rothermel; Ranking Member: Thomas Sutler Williams)
 Expenditures in the Interior Department (Chairman: James M. Graham; Ranking Member: Aaron S. Kreider)
 Expenditures in the Justice Department (Chairman: Robert F. Broussard; Ranking Member: Stephen G. Porter)
 Expenditures in the Labor Department (Chairman: James P. Maher; Ranking Member: John G. Cooper)
 Expenditures in the Navy Department (Chairman: Rufus Hardy; Ranking Member: George Edmund Foss)
 Expenditures in the Post Office Department (Chairman: N/A; Ranking Member: Harry H. Pratt)
 Expenditures in the State Department (Chairman: Courtney W. Hamlin; Ranking Member: George H. Tinkham)
 Expenditures in the Treasury Department (Chairman: Charles O. Lobeck; Ranking Member: Henry Wilson Temple)
 Expenditures in the War Department (Chairman: John A.M. Adair; Ranking Member: Luther W. Mott)
 Expenditures on Public Buildings (Chairman: Thomas F. Konop; Ranking Member: William A. Rodenberg)
 Foreign Affairs (Chairman: Henry D. Flood; Ranking Member: Henry Allen Cooper)
 Immigration and Naturalization (Chairman: John L. Burnett; Ranking Member: Everis A. Hayes)
 Indian Affairs (Chairman: John H. Stephens; Ranking Member: Philip P. Campbell)
 Industrial Arts and Expositions (Chairman: Edwin S. Underhill; Ranking Member: Frank P. Woods)
 Insular Affairs (Chairman: William A. Jones; Ranking Member: Horace M. Towner)
 Interstate and Foreign Commerce (Chairman: William C. Adamson; Ranking Member: John J. Esch)
 Invalid Pensions (Chairman: Isaac R. Sherwood; Ranking Member: John W. Langley)
 Irrigation of Arid Lands (Chairman: William R. Smith; Ranking Member: Moses P. Kinkaid)
 Judiciary (Chairman: Henry De Lamar Clayton; Ranking Member: Andrew J. Volstead)
 Labor (Chairman: David J. Lewis; Ranking Member: John M.C. Smith)
 Library (Chairman: James L. Slayden; Ranking Member: William B. McKinley)
 Merchant Marine and Fisheries (Chairman: Joshua W. Alexander; Ranking Member: William S. Greene)
 Mileage (Chairman: Warren W. Bailey; Ranking Member: Burnett M. Chiperfield)
 Military Affairs (Chairman: James Hay; Ranking Member: Julius Kahn)
 Mines and Mining (Chairman: Martin D. Foster; Ranking Member: Mahlon M. Garland)
 Naval Affairs (Chairman: Lemuel P. Padgett; Ranking Member: Thomas S. Butler)
 Patents (Chairman: William A. Oldfield; Ranking Member: John I. Nolan)
 Pensions (Chairman: John A. Key; Ranking Member: Sam R. Sells)
 Post Office and Post Roads (Chairman: John A. Moon; Ranking Member: Halvor Steenerson)
 Printing (Chairman: Henry A. Barnhart; Ranking Member: Edgar R. Kiess)
 Public Buildings and Grounds (Chairman: Frank Clark; Ranking Member: Richard W. Austin)
 Public Lands (Chairman: Scott Ferris; Ranking Member: Irvine L. Lenroot)
 Railways and Canals (Chairman: Martin Dies; Ranking Member: William L. La Follette)
 Reform in the Civil Service (Chairman: Hannibal L. Godwin; Ranking Member: William B. McKinley)
 Revision of Laws (Chairman: John T. Watkins; Ranking Member: Merrill Moores)
 Rivers and Harbors (Chairman: Stephen M. Sparkman; Ranking Member: William E. Humphrey)
 Roads (Chairman: Dorsey W. Shackleford; Ranking Member: Thomas B. Dunn)
 Rules (Chairman: Robert L. Henry; Ranking Member: Philip P. Campbell) 
 Standards of Official Conduct
 Territories (Chairman: William C. Houston; Ranking Member: Frank Guernsey)
 War Claims (Chairman: Alexander W. Gregg; Ranking Member: Benjamin K. Focht)
 Ways and Means (Chairman: Oscar Underwood; Ranking Member: Joseph W. Fordney)
 Whole

Joint committees

 Armor Plant Costs (Special)
 Conditions of Indian Tribes (Special)
 Federal Aid in Construction of Post Roads
 Disposition of (Useless) Executive Papers
 The Library (Chairman: Sen. John Sharp Williams)
 Interstate Commerce (Chairman: Sen. Francis G. Newlands)
 Investigate the General Parcel Post
 Printing (Chairman: Sen. Duncan U. Fletcher)
 Postage on 2nd Class Mail Matter and Compensation for Transportation of Mail (Chairman: Sen. Jonathan Bourne Jr.)
 Rural Credits (Chairman: Rep. Carter Glass)
 Second Class Mail Matter and Compensation for Rail Mail Service

Caucuses
 Democratic (House)
 Democratic (Senate)

Employees

Legislative branch agency directors
Architect of the Capitol:  Elliott Woods
Librarian of Congress: Herbert Putnam
Public Printer of the United States: Cornelius Ford

Senate
Chaplain: F. J. Prettyman (Methodist)
Secretary: James M. Baker
Librarian: Edward C. Goodwin
Sergeant at Arms: Charles P. Higgins

House of Representatives
Chaplain: Henry N. Couden
Clerk: South Trimble
Clerk at the Speaker's Table: Bennett C. Clark
Doorkeeper: Joseph J. Sinnott
Reading Clerks: Patrick Joseph Haltigan (D) and H. Martin Williams (R)
Postmaster: William M. Dunbar
Sergeant at Arms: Robert B. Gordon

See also 
 1914 United States elections (elections leading to this Congress)
 1914 United States Senate elections
 1914 United States House of Representatives elections
 1916 United States elections (elections during this Congress, leading to the next Congress)
 1916 United States presidential election
 1916 United States Senate elections
 1916 United States House of Representatives elections

Notes

References